A slide hosting service is a website that allows users to upload, view, comment, and share slideshows created with presentation programs. According to Alexa and Compete rankings, the most popular slide hosting services include websites such as SlideShare, MyPlick,  Slideboom, SlideServe, SlideWorld and SlidePub.

Main range of application 

Slide hosting services became very popular in such fields as eLearning and web-conferencing. Many electronic courses contain videos, audios, animations, which is easy to accomplish within a PowerPoint presentation. After uploading a presentation to a slide hosting service, a user receives an HTML code, which allows embedding it to a website or blog, or sharing it with a friend afterwards. Slide hosting services’ users can join groups by interests and debate about any subject they are interested in. These portals are also used in advertising purposes.

Technical concepts 

Slide hosting services convert uploaded files into the Flash format. It allows viewing video clips online while downloading them and reducing the original file size. SlidePub, SlideShare and authorSTREAM services uses HTML5 format.

Popular slide hosting services (features)

References 

Web hosting